Justin Jones (born August 28, 1996) is an American football defensive tackle for the Chicago Bears of the National Football League (NFL). He played college football at NC State. He was drafted by the Los Angeles Chargers in the third round of the 2018 NFL Draft.

College career
Following his senior season, Jones was selected to play in the 2018 Senior Bowl.

Professional career 
On November 29, 2017, it was announced that Jones had accepted his invitation to play in the Senior Bowl. He impressed scouts by showing his agility during Senior Bowl practices and added value to his draft stock. On January 27, 2018, Jones played in the 2018 Reese's Senior Bowl and was part of Denver Broncos' head coach Vance Joseph's South team that lost 45–16 to the North team, coached by Houston Texans' head coach Bill O'Brien. Jones attended the NFL Scouting Combine in Indianapolis and completed all of the combine and positional drills. On March 19, 2018, he participated at NC State's pro day, but opted to stand on his combine numbers and only performed positional drills and the short shuttle. At the conclusion of the pre-draft process, Jones was projected to be a fifth or sixth round pick by NFL draft experts 
and scouts. He was ranked as the 14th best defensive tackle prospect in the draft by Scouts Inc. and was ranked the 20th best defensive tackle by DraftScout.com.

The Los Angeles Chargers selected Jones in the third round (84th overall) in the 2018 NFL Draft. Jones was the eighth defensive tackle drafted in 2018.

Los Angeles Chargers
On May 13, 2018, the Los Angeles Chargers signed Jones to a four-year, $3.62 million contract that includes a signing bonus of $854,140.

On September 26, 2020, Jones was placed on injured reserve with a shoulder injury. He was activated on October 24.

On October 4, 2021, Jones was placed on injured reserve. He was activated on October 30.

Chicago Bears
On March 18, 2022, Jones signed a two-year deal with the Chicago Bears.

References

External links
NC State Wolfpack bio
Los Angeles Chargers bio

1996 births
Living people
American football defensive tackles
Chicago Bears players
Los Angeles Chargers players
NC State Wolfpack football players
People from Austell, Georgia
Players of American football from Georgia (U.S. state)
Sportspeople from Cobb County, Georgia